Snider may refer to:

Places
United States
Snider, West Virginia, an unincorporated community
Sniderville, Wisconsin, an unincorporated community

Other uses
Snider (surname)
Snider–Enfield, a firearm

See also
Snyder (disambiguation)
Schneider (disambiguation)
Schnyder, a Swiss surname